Francesco Bruni may refer to:

 Francesco Bruni (artist) (c. 1660–?), Italian engraver
 Francesco Bruni (bishop) (1802–1863), bishop in Roman Catholic Diocese of Ugento-Santa Maria di Leuca
Francesco Bruni (linguist) (born 1943), Italian linguist, see Veronese Riddle
 Francesco Bruni (screenwriter) (born 1961), Italian screenwriter and director
 Francesco Bruni (Senator) (born 1964), politician on List of members of the Italian Senate, 2013–18
 Francesco Bruni (sailor) (born 1973), Italian Olympic sailor

See also 
 Francesco Bruno (born 1968), Italian sport shooter